Reginar may refer to:
 Reginar, Duke of Lorraine (c. 850–915)
 Reginar II, Count of Hainaut (c. 890–932)
 Reginar III, Count of Hainaut (c. 920–973)
 Reginar IV, Count of Mons (c. 950–1013)
 Reginar V, Count of Mons (c. 995–1039)
 House of Reginar

See also
 Ragnar (disambiguation)
 Rainer (disambiguation)
 Regnier (disambiguation)
 Reinier (disambiguation)
 Reynier (disambiguation)